Dame Lynn Faith Gladden  (born 30 July 1961) is the Shell Professor of Chemical Engineering at the University of Cambridge. She served as Pro-vice-chancellor for research from 2010 to 2016.

Gladden was elected a member of the National Academy of Engineering in 2015 for contributions to chemical reactor engineering through the uniquely specific application of magnetic resonance imaging.

Since October 2018 she has been executive chair at the EPSRC.

Early life and education
Gladden was born on 30 July 1961. Her father is John Montague Gladden and her mother, Sheila Faith Deverell. Gladden was educated at the Heathfield School in Harrow. She obtained a Bachelor of Science degree in Chemical Physics at the University of Bristol in 1982 and a PhD in physical chemistry at Cambridge in 1987. She also holds a Postgraduate Certificate in Education (PGCE) in Physics from the University of Oxford.

Career and research
Gladden began her career as a lecturer at the University of Cambridge from 1987 to 1991. She was appointed a reader from 1995 to 1999, when she was promoted to professor. She was head of the Department of Chemical Engineering and Biotechnology, University of Cambridge until 1 October 2010. She was also a Pro-vice-chancellor from 1 January 2010 up until 1 January 2016. and has been a Fellow of Trinity College, Cambridge since 1999.

Gladden is the lead researcher at the university's magnetic resonance research centre (MRRC). She is also a member of the judging panel for the Queen Elizabeth Prize for Engineering. Gladden was appointed as a non-executive director of British Land in March 2015.

Honours and awards
She is a Chartered Chemist and Chartered Engineer, a Fellow of the Institution of Chemical Engineers and a Fellow of the Institute of Physics (FInstP) and a Fellow of the Royal Society of Chemistry (FRSC).
 
 
 
 
 
  
 
 
 

Gladden was appointed Dame Commander of the Order of the British Empire (DBE) in the 2020 New Year Honours for services to academic and industrial research in chemical engineering.

References

Place of birth missing (living people)
Alumni of the University of Bristol
Alumni of Trinity College, Cambridge
British women engineers
British chemical engineers
British corporate directors
Chemical engineering professors at the University of Cambridge
Female Fellows of the Royal Society
Fellows of the Royal Academy of Engineering
Female Fellows of the Royal Academy of Engineering
Living people
Dames Commander of the Order of the British Empire
Fellows of Trinity College, Cambridge
English physical chemists
English women scientists
1961 births
Alumni of Keble College, Oxford
Fellows of the Royal Society
Fellows of the Royal Society of Chemistry
Fellows of the Institute of Physics
21st-century women engineers
21st-century English women
21st-century English people
People educated at Heathfield School, Pinner